Kim Barnes (born 1958 Lewiston, Idaho) is a contemporary American author of fiction, memoir, and personal essays. She served as Poet Laureate of Idaho.

Life 
She returned with her mother to their logging camp on Orofino Creek in the Clearwater National Forest, where her father worked as a lumberjack.  For the next twelve years, she and her family lived in small communities and cedar camps in northern IdahoPierce, Headquarters, and a number of places along the North Fork of the Clearwater River.  In 1970, her family moved to Lewiston, Idaho, where Barnes graduated from Lewiston High School in 1976.

Barnes received her B.A. in English from Lewis-Clark State College in 1983, her M.A. in English from Washington State University in 1985, and her M.F.A. in Creative Writing from the University of Montana in 1995. 
Barnes teaches creative writing at the University of Idaho, and lives with her husband, Robert Wrigley, a poet, in Idaho.  They have three children.

Barnes's creative works addresses subjects including the American West, religious fundamentalism, women's issues, logging, and the environment, and reflects her interest in feminist interpretations of mythology and Jungian archetypes. In A Country Called Home, one of her main characters has the condition known as synesthesia and sees color when she hears music.

Her work has appeared widely in anthologies and journals, including The Georgia Review, Shenandoah, MORE Magazine, and the Pushcart Prize anthology.

Barnes will appear on the new Lit Hub/Podglomerate Storybound (podcast), accompanied by an original score from Americana duo Pretty Gritty.

Awards
She is the recipient of two grants from the Idaho Commission on the Arts. In 1995, she was chosen to receive the PEN/Jerard fellowship given to an emerging woman writer of nonfiction. In 1997, she was honored with a Pacific Northwest Booksellers Association Award for In the Wilderness, which was also a finalist for the Pulitzer Prize, and the Quality Paperback Book Club's New Visions Award.
From 2004 to 2007, she served as Idaho Writer-in-Residence.

Published work

Memoirs

Novels

Editor

References

External links
KimBarnes.com
An Interview with Kim Barnes, Part One

1958 births
Lewis–Clark State College alumni
Washington State University alumni
University of Montana alumni
University of Idaho faculty
Living people
Poets Laureate of Idaho
People from Clearwater County, Idaho
People from Lewiston, Idaho